.kkrieger (from Krieger, German for warrior) is a German first-person shooter video game created by German demogroup .theprodukkt (a former subdivision of Farbrausch), which won first place in the 96k game competition at Breakpoint in April 2004. The game remains a beta version , rendering it a perpetual beta.

Development history
.theprodukkt have developed .kkrieger since mid-2002, using their tool .werkkzeug (from Werkzeug, German for tool). They used an unreleased version of .werkkzeug called .werkkzeug3. The source code of .werkkzeug3 engine was made available by the group in 2014, either under the BSD license or as public domain.

Procedural content

.kkrieger makes extensive use of procedural generation methods. Textures are stored via their creation history instead of a per-pixel basis, thus only requiring the history data and the generator code to be compiled into the executable, producing a relatively small file size. Meshes are created from basic solids such as boxes and cylinders, which are then deformed to achieve the desired shape - essentially a special way of box modeling. These two generation processes account for the extensive loading time of the game — all assets of the gameplay are reproduced during the loading phase.

The entire game uses only 97,280 bytes of disk space. In contrast, most contemporaneous first-person shooters filled one or more CDs or DVDs. According to the developers, .kkrieger itself would take up around 200–300 MB of space if it had been stored the conventional way.

The game music and sounds are produced by a multifunctional synthesizer called V2, which is fed a continuous stream of MIDI data. The synthesizer then produces the music in real time.

Reception
The game won two German game developer prizes at the Deutscher Entwicklerpreis in 2006, in Innovation and Advancement.

Gaming website Acid-Play gave the game 2/5 stars and a mixed review, mainly praising the game's file size, calling it "not a featureless game, but one whose limitations break barriers in terms of what can be done" and ultimately stating that "you’ll never find a game which has this much and comes in such a small package."

See also 

 Demoscene

References

External links
Official .kkrieger website (via Internet Archive)
.kkrieger on MobyGames
.kkrieger source code on GitHub
Documentation about .kkrieger on YouTube

2004 video games
Demoscene software
First-person shooters
Science fiction video games
Software using the BSD license
Video games developed in Germany
Video games using procedural generation
Windows games
Windows-only games